Cumbria is a ceremonial and non-metropolitan county in North West England, bordering Scotland. The county and Cumbria County Council, its local government, came into existence in 1974 after the passage of the Local Government Act 1972. Cumbria's county town is Carlisle, in the north of the county. Other major settlements include Barrow-in-Furness, Kendal, Whitehaven and Workington.

The administrative county of Cumbria consists of six districts (Allerdale, Barrow-in-Furness, Carlisle, Copeland, Eden and South Lakeland) and, in 2019, had a population of 500,012. Cumbria is one of the most sparsely populated counties in England, with 73.4 people per km2 (190/sq mi). On 1 April 2023, the administrative county of Cumbria will be abolished and replaced with two new unitary authorities: Westmorland and Furness (Barrow-in-Furness, Eden, South Lakeland) and Cumberland (Allerdale, Carlisle, Copeland).

Cumbria is the third largest ceremonial county in England by area. It is bounded to the north-east by Northumberland, the east by County Durham, 
the south-east by North Yorkshire, the south by Lancashire, the west by the Irish Sea, and the north by the Scottish council areas of Dumfries and Galloway and Scottish Borders.

Cumbria is predominantly rural and contains the Lake District National Park, a UNESCO World Heritage Site considered one of England's finest areas of natural beauty, serving as inspiration for visual artists, writers and musicians. A large area of the south-east of the county is within the Yorkshire Dales National Park, while the east of the county fringes the North Pennines AONB. An upland, coastal and rural area, Cumbria's history is characterised by invasions, migration and settlement, as well as battles and skirmishes between the English and the Scots. Notable historic sites in Cumbria include Hadrian's Wall (also a World Heritage Site), Carlisle Castle, Furness Abbey, Hardknott Roman Fort, and Brough Castle.

Name
The place names Cumbria and Cumberland both mean "land of the Cumbrians" and are names derived from the term that had been used by the inhabitants of the area to describe themselves. In the period c.400 to c.1100, it is likely that any group of people living in Britain who identified as ‘Britons’ called themselves by a name similar to ‘Cum-ri’ which means "fellow countrymen" (and has also survived in the Welsh name for Wales which is Cymru). The first datable record of the place name as Cumberland is from an entry in the Anglo Saxon Chronicle for the year AD 945. This record refers to a kingdom known to the Anglo Saxons as Cumberland (often also known as Strathclyde) which in the 10th Century may have stretched from Loch Lomond to Leeds. The first king to be unequivocally described as king of the Cumbrians is Owain ap Dyfnwal who ruled from c.915 to c.937.

History

The county of Cumbria was created in April 1974 through an amalgamation of the administrative counties of Cumberland and Westmorland, to which parts of Lancashire (the area known as Lancashire North of the Sands) and of the West Riding of Yorkshire were added.

During the Neolithic period the area contained an important centre of stone axe production (the so-called Langdale axe factory), products of which have been found across Great Britain. During this period stone circles and henges were built across the county and today 'Cumbria has one of the largest number of preserved field monuments in England'.

While not part of the region conquered in the Romans' initial conquest of Britain in AD 43, most of modern-day Cumbria was later conquered in response to a revolt deposing the Roman-aligned ruler of the Brigantes in AD 69. The Romans built a number of fortifications in the area during their occupation, the most famous being UNESCO World Heritage Site Hadrian's Wall which passes through northern Cumbria.

At the end of the period of British history known as Roman Britain the inhabitants of Cumbria were Cumbric-speaking native Romano-Britons who were probably descendants of the Brigantes and Carvetii (sometimes considered to be a sub-tribe of the Brigantes) that the Roman Empire had conquered in about AD 85. Based on inscriptional evidence from the area, the Roman  of the Carvetii seems to have covered portions of Cumbria. The names Cumbria,  (the native Welsh name for Wales), Cambria, and Cumberland are derived from the name these people gave themselves, *kombroges in Common Brittonic, which originally meant "compatriots".

Although Cumbria was previously believed to have formed the core of the Early Middle Ages Brittonic kingdom of Rheged, more recent discoveries near Galloway appear to contradict this. For the rest of the first millennium, Cumbria was contested by several entities who warred over the area, including the Brythonic Celtic Kingdom of Strathclyde and the Anglian kingdom of Northumbria. Most of modern-day Cumbria was a principality in the Kingdom of Scotland at the time of the Norman conquest of England in 1066 and thus was excluded from the Domesday Book survey of 1086. In 1092 the region was invaded by William II and incorporated into England. Nevertheless, the region was dominated by the many Anglo-Scottish Wars of the latter Middle Ages and early modern period and the associated Border Reivers who exploited the dynamic political situation of the region. There were at least three sieges of Carlisle fought between England and Scotland, and two further sieges during the Jacobite risings.

After the Jacobite Risings of the 18th century, Cumbria became a more stable place and, as in the rest of Northern England, the Industrial Revolution caused a large growth in urban populations. In particular, the west coast towns of Workington, Millom and Barrow-in-Furness saw large iron and steel mills develop, with Barrow also developing a significant shipbuilding industry. Kendal, Keswick and Carlisle all became mill towns, with textiles, pencils and biscuits among the products manufactured in the region. The early 19th century saw the county gain fame when the Lake Poets and other artists of the Romantic movement, such as William Wordsworth and Samuel Taylor Coleridge, lived among, and were inspired by, the lakes and mountains of the region. Later, the children's writer Beatrix Potter also wrote in the region and became a major landowner, granting much of her property to the National Trust on her death. In turn, the large amount of land owned by the National Trust assisted in the formation in 1951 of the Lake District National Park, which remains the largest National Park in England and has come to dominate the identity and economy of the county.

The Windscale fire of 10 October 1957 was the worst nuclear accident in Great Britain's history.

The county of Cumbria was created in 1974 from the traditional counties of Cumberland and Westmorland, the Cumberland County Borough of Carlisle, along with the North Lonsdale or Furness part of Lancashire, usually referred to as "Lancashire North of the Sands", (including the county borough of Barrow-in-Furness) and, from the West Riding of Yorkshire, the Sedbergh Rural District. It is governed by Cumbria County Council.

On 2 June 2010, taxi driver Derrick Bird killed 12 people and injured 11 others in a shooting spree that spanned over  along the Cumbrian coastline.

Local newspapers The Westmorland Gazette and Cumberland and Westmorland Herald continue to use the name of their historic counties. Other publications, such as local government promotional material, describe the area as "Cumbria", as does the Lake District National Park Authority.

Geography

Cumbria is the most northwesterly county of England. The northernmost and southernmost points in Cumbria are just west of Deadwater, Northumberland and South Walney respectively. Kirkby Stephen (close to Tan Hill, North Yorkshire) and St Bees Head are the most easterly and westerly points of the county. Most of Cumbria is mountainous, with the majority of the county being situated in the Lake District while the Pennines, consisting of the Yorkshire Dales and the North Pennines, lie at the eastern and south-east areas of the county. At  Scafell Pike is the highest point in Cumbria and in England. Windermere is the largest natural lake in England.

The Lancaster Canal runs from Preston into South Cumbria and is partly in use. The Ulverston Canal which once reached to Morecambe Bay is maintained although it was closed in 1945. The Solway Coast and Arnside and Silverdale AONB's lie in the lowland areas of the county, to the north and south respectively.

Boundaries and divisions
Cumbria is bordered by the English counties of Northumberland, County Durham, North Yorkshire, Lancashire, and the Scottish council areas of Dumfries and Galloway and Scottish Borders.

The boundaries are along the Irish Sea to Morecambe Bay in the west, and along the Pennines to the east. Cumbria's northern boundary stretches from the Solway Firth from the Solway Plain eastward along the border with Scotland to Northumberland.

It is made up of six districts: Allerdale, Barrow-in-Furness, Carlisle, Copeland, Eden and South Lakeland. For many administrative purposes Cumbria is divided into three areas — East, West and South. East consists of the districts of Carlisle and Eden, West consists of Allerdale and Copeland, and South consists of Lakeland and Barrow.

In July 2021, the UK government announced proposals for the county and district councils to be abolished and replaced by two new unitary authorities, one for the east (Barrow-in-Furness, Eden, and South Lakeland), to be called Westmorland and Furness and one for the west (Allerdale, Carlisle, and Copeland), to be called Cumberland.

The county returns six Members of Parliament to the House of Commons, representing the constituencies of Carlisle, Penrith & The Border, Workington, Copeland, Westmorland and Lonsdale and Barrow & Furness.

Economy

Many large companies and organisations are based in Cumbria. The county council itself employs around 17,000 individuals, while the largest private employer in Cumbria, the Sellafield nuclear processing site, has a workforce of 10,000. Below is a list of some of the county's largest companies and employers (excluding services such as Cumbria Constabulary, Cumbria Fire and Rescue and the NHS in Cumbria), categorised by district.

East

Barrow-in-Furness
 Barrow's shipyard is one of the UK's largest. BAE Systems is the current owner and employs around 5,000.
 Associated British Ports Holdings own and operate the port of Barrow.
 The only Kimberly-Clark mill in the North of England is located in Barrow.
 James Fisher & Sons, a large provider of marine engineering services, is based in Barrow.
 One of the largest single-site furniture stores in the UK, Stollers, is located in Barrow.

Eden
 Center Parcs owns a large resort in Whinfell Forest near Penrith.
 Logistics company Eddie Stobart Logistics, own a large transport depot at Penrith.
 National sawdust, animal bedding, bark suppliers and road hauliers A W Jenkinson are headquartered at Clifton, Penrith.

South Lakeland
 Pharmaceutical company GlaxoSmithKline operates a large factory in Ulverston.
 International kitchenware retailer Lakeland has its headquarters and flagship store in Windermere.
 Farley Health Products, a subsidiary of the Heinz Company, runs a factory in Kendal.

West

Allerdale
 Associated British Ports Holdings own and operate the port of Silloth.
 Plastic film maker Innovia Films has its headquarters and only UK factory in Wigton, which employs almost 1,000 people and is Wigton's biggest employer.
 Sealy Beds UK (which is part of the Silentnight Group) own a factory at Aspatria, which employs around 300 people.
 Carr's Group plc, which is based in Carlisle, owned a large factory at Silloth which makes the 'Carr's Breadmaker' range and at one time Carr's farm feeds. This has been sold to Whitworths.
 Window maker West Port Windows owns a large factory at Maryport, which makes UPVC windows and doors.
 Jennings Brewery Plc (now owned by Marston's Plc), a real ale brewery, based in Cockermouth.
 World rally company M-Sport has its headquarters at Dovenby Hall, Dovenby, near Cockermouth.
 Swedish paper maker Iggesund Paperboard has its only UK factory at Siddick, near Workington.
 U.S.-based Eastman Chemical Company had a factory at Siddick, near Workington. It made plastic bottle pellets and products for the smoking industry and employed 100 people. This has been subsequently demolished and production transferred overseas.
 Steel company Tata Steel owns a cast products plant at Workington, which employs 300 people.
 Eddie Stobart Logistics owns a large warehouse at Workington, which was once owned by truck and bus maker Leyland.
 Packaging company Amcor owns the former Alcan packaging plant at Salterbeck, Workington.
 James Walker Ltd, an international high-performance sealing manufacturer, has a large factory at Cockermouth.

Carlisle
 Close to 1,000 people work in one of only two Pirelli tyre plants in the UK.
 Carr's is a successful foodstuff and agricultural brand that was established in 1831 in Carlisle.
 Stobart Group owns the Carlisle Lake District Airport and its rail maintenance business is based in Carlisle.
 Eddie Stobart, which is one of the UK's largest logistics companies, used to be headquartered in Carlisle.
 Nestlé operates a factory on the outskirts of Carlisle.
 Cavaghan & Gray (owned by the by 2 Sisters Food Group) is a food manufacturing business based in Carlisle and a significant employer in the city.
 Crown Holdings owns two factories in Carlisle, locally known as 'Metal Box'. Both factories make products for the beverage industry.
 Edinburgh Woollen Mill announced plans to move their HQ from Langholm, Scottish Borders to Carlisle.

Copeland
 Sellafield is the largest private employer in the county; many West Cumbrians have links to the site.

Tourism

The largest and most widespread industry in Cumbria is tourism. The Lake District National Park alone receives some 15.8 million visitors every year. Despite this, fewer than 50,000 people reside permanently within the Lake District: mostly in Ambleside, Bowness-on-Windermere, Coniston, Keswick, Gosforth, Grasmere and Windermere. Over 36,000 Cumbrians are employed in the tourism industry which adds £1.1 billion a year to the county's economy. The Lake District and county as a whole attract visitors from across the UK, Europe, North America and the Far East (particularly Japan). The tables below show the twenty most-visited attractions in Cumbria in 2009. (Not all visitor attractions provided data to Cumbria Tourism who collated the list. Notable examples are Furness Abbey, the Lakes Aquarium and South Lakes Safari Zoo, the last of which would almost certainly rank within the top five).

Economic output

This is a chart of the trend of regional gross value added (GVA) of East and West Cumbria at current basic prices published (pp. 240–253) by the Office for National Statistics

Politics

Local
Until April 2023 Cumbria will be administered by Cumbria County Council and six district councils: Allerdale, Barrow-in-Furness, Carlisle, Copeland, Eden, and South Lakeland.

In July 2021 the Ministry of Housing, Communities and Local Government announced that, on 1 April 2023, the administrative county will be reorganised into two unitary authorities: one to be known as Cumberland, and the other as Westmorland and Furness. Cumbria County Council and the six districts are to be abolished and their functions transferred to the new authorities. The two new unitary authorities will continue to constitute a ceremonial county named "Cumbria" for the purpose of lieutenancy and shrievalties, being presided over by a Lord Lieutenant of Cumbria and a High Sheriff of Cumbria.

Cumberland
The new northern/western authority, to be known as Cumberland, will cover the current districts of Allerdale, Carlisle, and Copeland. The territory constitutes most of the former county of Cumberland. Its largest settlement will be Carlisle.

Westmorland and Furness
The new southern/eastern authority, to be known as Westmorland and Furness, will cover the current districts of Barrow-in-Furness, Eden, and South Lakeland. The territory includes the former county of Westmorland and neighbouring areas. Its largest settlement will be Barrow-in-Furness.

National
At the 2019 general election, no Labour Members of Parliament (MPs) were elected, the first time since 1910.

Education

 

Although Cumbria has a comprehensive system almost fully, there is one state grammar school in Penrith. There are 42 state secondary schools and 10 independent schools. The more rural secondary schools tend to have sixth forms (although in Barrow-in-Furness district, no schools have sixth forms due to the only sixth college in Cumbria being located in the town) and this is the same for three schools in Allerdale and South Lakeland, and one in the other districts. Chetwynde is also the only school in Barrow to educate children from nursery all the way to year 11.

Colleges of further education in Cumbria include:
  Carlisle College
  Furness College which includes Barrow Sixth Form College
  Kendal College
  Lakes College West Cumbria

The University of Cumbria is one of the UK's newest universities, having been established in 2007. It is at present the only university in Cumbria and has campuses across the county, together with Lancaster and London.

Transport

Road

The M6 is the only motorway that runs through Cumbria. Kendal and Penrith are amongst its primary destinations. Further north it becomes the A74(M) at the border with Scotland north of Carlisle. Major A roads within Cumbria include:

Several bus companies run services in Cumbria serving the main towns and villages in the county, with some services running to neighbouring areas such as Lancaster. Stagecoach North West is the largest; it has depots in Barrow-in-Furness, Carlisle, Kendal and Workington. Stagecoach's flagship X6 route connects Barrow-in-Furness and Kendal in south Cumbria.

Ports
There are only two airports in the county: Carlisle Lake District and Barrow/Walney Island. Both airports formerly served scheduled passenger flights and both are proposing expansions and renovations to handle domestic and European flights in the near future. The nearest international airports to south Cumbria are Blackpool, Manchester, Liverpool John Lennon and Teesside. North Cumbria is closer to Newcastle, Glasgow Prestwick and Glasgow International.

Barrow-in-Furness is one of the country's largest shipbuilding centres, but the Port of Barrow is only minor, operated by Associated British Ports alongside the Port of Silloth in Allerdale. There are no ferry links from any port or harbour along the Cumbria coast.

Rail
The busiest railway stations in Cumbria are Carlisle, Barrow-in-Furness, Penrith and Oxenholme Lake District. The  West Coast Main Line runs through the Cumbria countryside, adjacent to the M6 motorway. The Cumbrian Coast Line connects Barrow-in-Furness to Carlisle and is a vital link in the west of the county. Other railways in Cumbria are the Windermere Branch Line, most of the Furness Line and much of the Settle-Carlisle Railway.

Demography

Cumbria's largest settlement and only city is Carlisle, in the north of the county. The largest town, Barrow-in-Furness, in the south, is slightly smaller. The county's population is largely rural: it has the second-lowest population density among English counties, and has only five towns with a population of over 20,000. Cumbria is also one of the country's most ethnically homogeneous counties, with 95.1% of the population categorised as White British (around 470,900 of the 495,000 Cumbrians). However, the larger towns have ethnic makeups that are closer to the national average. The 2001 census indicated that Christianity was the religion with the most adherents in the county.

2010 ONS estimates placed the number of foreign-born (non-United Kingdom) people living in Cumbria at around 14,000 and foreign nationals at 6,000. The 2001 UK Census showed the following most common countries of birth for residents of Cumbria that year:

Settlements

Largest parishes by district

Twinnings

Symbols and emblems
The arms of Cumbria County Council were granted by the College of Arms on 10 October 1974. The arms represent the areas from which the new county council's area was put together; the shield's green border has Parnassus flowers representing Cumberland interspersed with roses; red for Lancashire (the Furness district) on white for Yorkshire (Sedbergh is from the West Riding). The crest is a ram's head crest, found in the arms of both Westmorland County Council and Barrow County Borough, with Cumberland's Parnassus flowers again. The supporters are the legendary Dacre Bull (Cumberland) and a red dragon, redolent of Cumbria's Brittonic origin.(Appleby in Westmorland). They stand on a base compartment representing Hadrian's Wall (in Cumberland), crossed with two red bars (from the Westmorland arms).

The county council motto "Ad Montes Oculos Levavi" is Latin, from Psalm 121; ("I shall lift up mine eyes unto the hills").

The county flag of Cumbria is a banner of arms of Cumbria County Council.

Sport

Running
Fell running is a popular sport in Cumbria, with an active calendar of competitions taking place throughout the year.
Cumbria is also home to several of the most active orienteering clubs in the UK as well as the Lakes 5 Days competition that takes place every four years.

Football

Association

Barrow and Carlisle United are the only professional football teams in Cumbria and both currently play in EFL League Two. Carlisle United attract support from across Cumbria and beyond, with many Cumbrian "ex-pats" travelling to see their games, both home and away.

Workington—who are always known locally as "the reds"—are a well-supported non-league team, having been relegated from the Football League in the 1970s. Workington made a rapid rise up the non league ladder and in 2007/08 competed with Barrow in the Conference North. Barrow were then promoted to the Conference Premier in 2007/08. In 2020, Barrow were promoted to the Football League as a result of winning the National League.

Rugby league

Rugby league is a very popular sport in South and West Cumbria. Barrow, Whitehaven and Workington play in the Rugby League Championships.

Amateur teams; Wath Brow Hornets, Askam, Egremont Rangers, Kells, Barrow Island, Hensingham and Millom play in the National Conference.

Rugby union
Rugby union is popular in the east of the county with teams such as Furness RUFC & Hawcoat Park RUFC (South Cumbria), Workington RUFC (Workington Zebras), Whitehaven RUFC, Carlisle RUFC, Creighton RUFC, Aspatria RUFC, Wigton RUFC, Kendal RUFC, Kirkby Lonsdale RUFC, Keswick RUFC, Cockermouth RUFC, Upper Eden RUFC and Penrith RUFC.

Uppies and Downies

Workington is home to the ball game known as Uppies and Downies, a traditional version of football, with its origins in medieval football or an even earlier form. Players from outside Workington also take part, especially fellow West Cumbrians from Whitehaven and Maryport.

American
Cumbria is home to the Furness Phantoms, and the Carlisle Kestrels.

Cricket
Cumbria County Cricket Club is one of the cricket clubs that constitute the National Counties in the English domestic cricket structure. The club, based in Carlisle, competes in the National Counties Cricket Championship and the NCCA Knockout Trophy. The club also play some home matches in Workington, as well as other locations.

Cumbrian club cricket teams play in the North Lancashire and Cumbria League.

Wrestling

Cumberland and Westmorland wrestling is an ancient and well-practised tradition in the county with a strong resemblance to Scottish Backhold.

In the 21st century Cumberland and Westmorland wrestling along with other aspects of Lakeland culture are practised at the Grasmere Sports and Show, an annual meeting held every year since 1852 on the August Bank Holiday.

The origin of this form of wrestling is a matter of debate, with some describing it as having evolved from Norse wrestling brought over by Viking invaders, while other historians associate it with the Cornish and Gouren styles indicating that it may have developed out of a longer-standing Celtic tradition.

Motor

Karting
Cumbria Kart Racing Club is based at the Lakeland Circuit, Rowrah, between Cockermouth and Egremont Lakeland Circuit. The track is currently a venue for rounds of both major UK national karting championships About Cumbria Kart Racing Club. Formula One world champions Lewis Hamilton and Jenson Button both raced karts at Rowrah many times in the formative stages of their motor sport careers, while other F1 drivers, past and present, to have competed there include Johnny Herbert, Anthony Davidson, Allan McNish, Ralph Firman, Paul di Resta and David Coulthard, who hailed from just over the nearby Anglo-Scottish border and regarded Rowrah as his home circuit, becoming Cumbria Kart Racing Club Champion in 1985 in succession to McNish (di Resta also taking the CKRC title subsequently).

Baseball
Cumbria is home to the Cartmel Valley Lions, an amateur baseball team based in Cartmel.

Speedway
Workington Comets were a Workington-based professional speedway team, which competed in the British Speedway Championship.

Food

Cumbria is the UK county with the highest number of Michelin-starred restaurants, with seven in this classification in the Great Britain and Ireland Michelin Guide of 2021. Traditional Cumbrian cuisine has been influenced by the spices and molasses that were imported into Whitehaven in the 18th century. The Cumberland sausage (which has a protected geographical status) is a well-recognised result of this. Other regional specialities include Herdwick mutton and the salt-marsh raised lamb of the Cartmel peninsula.

Dialect influences

Celtic
 Cumbria was Celtic speaking until the Viking invasion, if not later (Cymry)
 Little English spoken in Cumbria; relatively sparsely populated until 12th/13th centuries 
 The invading Angles and Saxons forced the indigenous Celtic peoples back to the western highlands of Cumbria, Wales and Cornwall, with little linguistic consequence, apart from a residual scattering of place-names.
 Northwest – possibility of direct influence from Irish Gaelic across Irish Sea via Whitehaven until 10th century
 Celtic influence/kingdoms may have confirmed perception of difference between the north–south
 Linguistic interaction between Celts and English underrated: effectively Celtic influence marked the beginnings of a linguistic divide between English and other West Germanic dialects.
 Lexis – Celtic influence left specifically on the sound pattern of sheep-scoring numerals of Cumbrian and West Yorkshire
 Loss of inflections may be explained by contact with Celtic tribes and inter-marriage.

Anglo-Saxon/Viking
 Earliest Anglo-Saxon settlements in the east of England. Took over 200 years to establish a frontier in the west where the displaced British had settled
 Morphology – Old Northumbrian (little evidence) signs of loss of inflexions long before southern dialects below the Humber, precede Viking settlements and dialect contact situation

Scandinavian/Norse/Dane
 Lack of extent of Old English written evidence
 Main attacks/raids on the North-East coast at Lindisfarne and Jarrow in 793/ 794
 Settlement patterns (Danes) contributed to emerging differences over time between Northumberland. Durham and Yorkshire dialects 
 Norwegian settlers via Ireland to Isle of Man, Mersey estuary (901) and the Cumbrian/ Lancashire coasts (900-50) – dialectal differences (Danes/ Norwegians) often lumped together in standard histories – MUST have confirmed emerging dialectal differences east and west of the Pennines
 Danelaw – land of north and east of land ruled under Danish law and Danish customs (978-1016)  
 Scandinavian influences vocabulary – common words gradually diffused/ entered word stock (borrowings) which survive in regional use – ‘fell’ hillside, ‘lug’ ear, ‘loup’ jump, ‘aye’ yes
 Influence on grammatical structure  - Middle English texts reveal that present participle form ‘-and’, and possible that use of ‘at’ and ‘as’ as relative pronouns from Cumbria to East Yorkshire
  phonetically /g/, /k/ and cluster /sk/ have a northern/ Norse pronunciation /j/, /ʧ/ and /ʃ/ which are West Saxon – hard vs. soft consonants of north–south dialects – e.g. ‘give/ rigg’ ridge, ‘skrike’ shriek, ‘kist’ chest and ‘ik’
  ‘Interdialect forms’ in Danelaw area (diffuse > focussed situation) -  no clear idea about what language they were speaking – mixture of Old English and Norse e.g. ‘she’ (3rd person pronoun) is claimed by both languages
 ‘Bilingualism was norm in areas under Danelaw (plausible)
 Norse runic inscriptions survive from 11th century in Cumbria – therefore may only been after Norman Conquest that ‘Norse as a living language died out’
 Norse surviving longest in closed communities, as in the Lake District

Normans
 Jewell (1994: 20) - Northumbria retained relative independence until 13th century – effective government of North by Normans ‘petered-out’ at Lake District and North of Tees (not recorded in Domesday Book)
 Carlisle retaken by Scots in 1136

Cumbric

 Early 10th century – all of the northwest of England occupied by a mixture of newcomers from Ireland of mixed Viking and Gaelic ancestry. The grip from Northumbrian on the former territory of Rheged was that of Britons of Strathcylde reoccupied southwest Scotland and northwest England as far south as Derwent and Penrith.  which was held until Carlisle retaken by Scots in 1136
 Cumbric perhaps survived until it faded in the early 12th century throughout Cumbria.
 Cumbric score – counting sheep – Welsh correspondence   Welsh (un, dau, tri) – Cumberland (yan, tyan, tethera) – Westmorland (yan, than, teddera) – Lancashire (yan, taen, tedderte) – West Yorkshire (yain, tain, eddero)   – survived 7-8 centuries after the language itself had died – Brittonic origin
 Not one single complete phrase in Cumbric survives, evidence to suggest strong literary tradition, probably oral, some of this early material is known in a Welsh version

Media
Two evening newspapers are published daily in Cumbria. The News and Star focuses largely on Carlisle and the surrounding areas of north and west Cumbria, and the North-West Evening Mail is based in Barrow-in-Furness and covers news from across Furness and the South Lakes. The Cumberland and Westmorland Herald and The Westmorland Gazette are weekly newspapers based in Penrith and Kendal respectively. The Egremont 2Day newspaper, formerly Egremont Today when affiliated with the Labour Party, was a prominent monthly publication - founded by Peter Watson (and edited by him until his death in 2014) in 1990 until July 2018.  In February 2020 The Herdwick News, run by the last editor of The Egremont 2Day, was launched and is an independent online news publication covering the county of Cumbria and the North West.

Due to the size of Cumbria the county spans two television zones: BBC North East and Cumbria and ITV Tyne Tees & Border in the north and BBC North West and ITV Granada in the south. Heart North West, CFM Radio and Smooth Lake District are the most popular local radio stations throughout the county, with BBC Radio Cumbria being the only station that is aimed at Cumbria as a whole.

The Australian-New Zealand feature film The Navigator: A Medieval Odyssey (1988) is set in Cumbria during the onset of the Black Death in 14th-century Europe.

Cumbria is host to a number of festivals, including Kendal Calling (actually held in Penrith since 2009) and Kendal Mountain Festival.

Places of interest

Abbot Hall Art Gallery 
Appleby Castle 
Appleby Horse Fair (Gypsy fair)
Armitt Museum and Library, Ambleside
Bassenthwaite Lake
Bewcastle
Black Combe
Blackwell 
Brantwood 
Brough Castle  
Brougham Castle  
Brougham Hall
Broughton in Furness
Brougham Castle
Buttermere
Cartmel Priory 
Carlisle Castle  
Carlisle Cathedral 
Castlerigg Stone Circle
Church of St Olaf, Wasdale
Wainwright's Coast to Coast Walk
Cockermouth, "Gem" Town
Coniston Water
Crummock Water
Cumbria Coastal Way long distance footpath
Cumbria Way long distance footpath
Dales Way long distance footpath
Dalton Castle  
Derwent Water
Dock Museum 
Dove Cottage
Egremont Castle  
Eden Valley Railway
Ennerdale Water
Eskdale
Fell Foot Park 
Firbank Fell
Fisher Tarn Reservoir
Furness
Furness Abbey 
Grange-Over-Sands
Haig Colliery Mining Museum 
Harrison Stickle
Hadrian's Wall
Hartley Castle
Haweswater
Hawkshead Grammar School Museum
Hill Top
Hoad Monument
Hodbarrow Nature Reserve
Holker Hall 
Kendal Castle  
Kentmere
Killington Reservoir
Kirkby Lonsdale
Lakeside & Haverthwaite Railway 
Langwathby railway station
Windermere
Lakeland Wildlife Oasis 
Lanercost Priory 
Laurel & Hardy Museum
Levens Hall 
Millom
Millom Folk Museum 
Muncaster Castle   
Museum of Lakeland Life 
National Nature Reserves in Cumbria
Pennine Way long distance footpath
Penrith Castle  
Piel Island  
Quaker tapestry
Ravenglass & Eskdale Railway – heritage railway 
Rey Cross
Rheged
Rydal Water
Sea to Sea Cycle Route
Seathwaite Tarn
Sellafield Nuclear Reprocessing Facility
Silecroft
Silloth on Solway
Sizergh Castle & Garden  
Skelton Transmitting Station (U.Ks. tallest structure)
South Lakes Safari Zoo 
St Bees
St Bees Priory 
St Bees Head
Staveley
Stott Park Bobbin Mill
Swarthmoor Hall
Thirlmere
Ullswater
Ulverston
Vickerstown
Wasdale Head
Wast Water
Whitehaven
Whinfell Forest
Windermere Steamboat Museum

Notable people

See also

Anglo-Scottish border
Cumbria Police and Crime Commissioner
Cumbria shootings
Cumbrian dialect
Barrovian
Cumbrian toponymy
Cumbric language
Etymology of Cumbrian place names
Healthcare in Cumbria
List of Cumbria-related topics
List of High Sheriffs of Cumbria
List of Lord Lieutenants of Cumbria
Outline of England
Rose Castle

References

External links

 
Non-metropolitan counties
North West England
NUTS 2 statistical regions of the United Kingdom
Counties of England established in 1974